The Buick Encore is a subcompact crossover SUV built by General Motors since 2012. It is subcompact crossover SUV marketed by Buick and its fourth SUV overall after the Rendezvous, Rainier, and Enclave.

The "Encore" designation was previously used by American Motors Corporation (AMC) for the subcompact two and four-door hatchback variants of the U.S.-built front-wheel drive Renault Alliance from 1984 to 1987.



First generation (2013) 

The first-generation Encore a restyled first-generation Chevrolet Trax, and shares the same styling with the European Opel/Vauxhall Mokka. It debuted at the 2012 North American International Auto Show in Detroit on January 10, 2012, and went on sale at the end of 2012. The North American Encore is assembled at the GM Korea plant in Bupyeong, South Korea alongside the Trax. The Chinese market Encore is assembled in Shandong.

The 2013, 2014 and 2015 Encore in the U.S. was offered in Base, Convenience, Leather, and Premium level models with the A14NET 1.4-liter inline-four multi-port fuel injected (MFI) VVT turbo gasoline engine rated at  @ 4900 rpm coupled to a 6-speed automatic transmission. It was available in front-wheel drive (FWD) and all-wheel drive (AWD) versions.

For 2016, a new Sport Touring second tier model was added which included an 18-inch alloy wheels with midnight silver finish, rear spoiler, body-color door handles, remote start, fog lights, and a new more powerful B14XFT Ecotec inline four-cylinder direct fuel injection VVT engine rated at  @ 5600 rpm in Encore marketing materials. However, Opel in Europe rates the engine for the Mokka at  @ 4900–6000 rpm.

The Ecotec direct-injection engine package includes Stop/Start technology to improve fuel economy and was made available as an option on all but the base model for 2017 and 2018. In 2017, the model levels became Base, Preferred, Sport Touring, Preferred II, Essence, and Premium.

2017 refresh 
For 2017, the Buick Encore received revised headlights and bumpers, LED tail lights, and the interior received a revised dash and gauge cluster with a 4.2-inch information screen, a revised center stack, and infotainment system with an 8-inch frameless screen. The faux fender ports, marketed as VentiPorts on models from 2013 to 2016, were deleted.

Following the introduction of the all-new Encore GX for the 2020 model year, the Encore remained in the Buick lineup as the brand's "entry-level" vehicle. All trims except for the mid-level Preferred trim were discontinued, and the Preferred became the new "base model" of the Encore, with limited exterior color options, only one interior color option, and condensed options.

Discontinuation 
In March 2022, General Motors confirmed that it would be discontinuing the Buick Encore following the 2022 model year. There will be no direct replacement, and the larger Buick Encore GX will become the new entry-level vehicle in the Buick lineup.

Safety

Second generation (2020) 

The second-generation Encore was revealed alongside the Encore GX during the 2019 Shanghai Auto Show.

The second-generation Encore is not exported to North America, since it uses the GEM platform intended for emerging markets. The first-generation Encore has continued to be sold in North America, along with the new Buick Encore GX that debuted in 2020.

Sales

References

External links 

 

2010s cars
All-wheel-drive vehicles
Encore
Cars introduced in 2012
Cars of China
Crossover sport utility vehicles
Front-wheel-drive vehicles
Mini sport utility vehicles